The Voisin Icare Aero-yacht  was an early flying boat built by Voisin Frères for the oil magnate and promoter of early aviation experimentation Henry Deutsch de la Meurthe. It first flew in 1912.

Design and development
It was initially built as a four-bay unequal-span biplane.  The wings, which had trailing edge ailerons mounted on the upper surfaces only, were mounted on top of a Ricochet motorboat hull.  A 200 hp (150 kW) Clerget engine drove a four bladed pusher configuration propeller mounted mid-gap via a chain. The inverted-T configuration empennage was mounted on booms.  It carried six passengers, and had provision for an armament of two cannon.

It was later modified by extending the lower wing and fitting inset ailerons to both upper and lower wings.

It was first flown as a landplane on 23 November 1912 at Issy-les-Moulineaux with the full complement of six passengers.

Specifications

Notes

References

 Opdycke, Leonard E French Aeroplanes Before the Great War Atglen, PA: Schiffer, 1999 

Icare Aero-Yacht
1910s French experimental aircraft
Single-engined pusher aircraft
Rotary-engined aircraft
Biplanes
Aircraft first flown in 1912